Forced Entry is a 2002 pornographic film written and directed by Lizzy Borden, produced by Rob Zicari, and released by Extreme Associates. The film is loosely based on the crimes of California serial killer Richard Ramirez.

Plot 
A man knocks on a teenage girl's door, claiming to be in need of directions. When the girl leaves to answer the phone, the man sneaks in and grabs her when she returns. Physically and verbally assaulting the girl, the man drags her into a bedroom by the neck and rapes her. Tracking the killer is obnoxious Channel 5 Action News reporter Roberto Negro, who has been receiving taunting letters from the murderer. The killer and two accomplices (one of them initially reluctant) attack a pregnant housewife, filming themselves pummeling and raping her at gunpoint. When the trio finishes, they shoot the woman and her dog. Roberto reports on the housewife's death, and while the authorities refuse to confirm there is a serial killer on the loose, Roberto is convinced there is.

Spotting a woman having car trouble, the killer and his partners pull up in their van, force her into the vehicle and take her to their hideout. The woman is filmed being abused, raped and stabbed. An envelope containing a knife, a gun and another note is sent to Roberto and the police acquire clues from these items. Another package, this one containing a VHS tape, is dropped off at Roberto's office. The tape is a tribute to the killer, showing two of his fans brutalizing and sexually assaulting a woman. Roberto recognizes one of the copycats as a gas station attendant, whom the police arrests. Elsewhere, two men recognize the serial killer when he walks by them on the street and chase him, being joined by several others. The killer is cornered in an alleyway, and beat and stabbed to death. Roberto finds the man's body and kicks it twice before walking away.

Cast 
 Jewel De'Nyle as Victim #1
 Taylor St. Claire as Victim #2
 Veronica Cain as Victim #3
 Alexandra Quinn as The Copycat Killer's Victim
 Michael Stefano as The Killer
 Mickey G. as Accomplice #1
 Brian Surewood as Accomplice #2
 Valentino as The Copycat Killer
 Rob Zicari as Roberto Negro
 Angel
 Mr. Vegas
 Pete Malloy
 Wanker Wang
 Dr. Jeckyl
 Evil Merchant
 Derek Newblood
 Sylveeya
 Doomhammer
 Smiley Johnson
 Rawhide Kid
 Rod Fontana
 Mr. Pete
 X-Man
 Juggs
 Tony Tedeschi

Reception 

The crew of the television series Frontline stormed off in disgust while visiting the set of the film for their documentary American Porn. The incident led to the United States v. Extreme Associates obscenity trial. Paul Fishbein, president of AVN, referred to Forced Entry and the rest of the Extreme Associates library as "horrible, unwatchable, disgusting, aberrant movies".

The Village Voice stated the film is "The most violent porno I've seen. It's both shocking and completely banal" while Adult FYI wrote "It's brutal. More than that, it's terribly evil. Convincing. Incredibly well acted and directed". A score of six out of ten was awarded by Cyberspace Adult Video Reviews, which concluded its review with "They have every right to make and sell this tape. It is a shame that these very talented people would waste their time on this. Can you imagine the good stuff they could be doing?" 

Forced Entry was described as "a disturbing piece of hardcore, made by and for some very disturbed people" by Recarts Movies Erotica, which said that while the acting was good and it succeeded in creating physical and sexual tension, it suffered from cheesy effects and editing, inconsistent camerawork, and poor production values. Adult Industry News decried Forced Entry as a borderline snuff film, writing "promoting violence and/or making (or trying to make) rape look sexy is very disturbing" and "movies like this are more than controversial, they are bad for the adult film business". Academic Eugenie Brinkema has written extensively on the film, its content and its reception in an article called "Rough Sex".

See also 
 Forced Entry, a similar film released in 1973.
 United States v. Extreme Associates, Inc.

References

External links 
 
 

Films about Satanism
2002 films
2002 horror films
Gonzo pornography
American serial killer films
American erotic horror films
American rape and revenge films
Films about snuff films
Films about journalists
Obscenity controversies in film
2000s pornographic films
Films about animal cruelty
Pornographic horror films
2002 direct-to-video films
American pornographic films
Direct-to-video horror films
Films set in Los Angeles
Films shot in Los Angeles
Cultural depictions of Richard Ramirez
Extreme Associates
2000s English-language films
2000s American films